Mark Karan (born January 13, 1955) is an American guitarist and singer. He is best known for his long-term work with former members of the Grateful Dead, in RatDog (1998–2013), the Other Ones (1998–2000), Mickey Hart's band Planet Drum (1999), and Phil Lesh and Friends (2012). Karan has also played and toured with Terrapin Flyer, Delaney Bramlett, the Rembrandts, Sophie B. Hawkins, Dave Mason, and Paul Carrack.

Karan leads the bands Jemimah Puddleduck and Mark Karan's Buds.  In 2009 he released a solo album, Walk Through the Fire.

Career
Karan has played guitar and sung for a number of different artists, including Dave Mason, Huey Lewis, Paul Carrack, Delaney Bramlett, Sophie B. Hawkins, and The Rembrandts. From 1986 to 1989 he was the guitarist and co-producer for the band Slings & Arrows which included Daniel Levitin on bass.

In 1998 he was selected, behind Steve Kimock, to fill Jerry Garcia's slot in The Other Ones, a band featuring former members of the Grateful Dead. He played with the Other Ones on their 1998 and 2000 tours, and appeared with the 1998 lineup on their only album, the live compilation "The Strange Remain" in 1999.  He has also played with Mickey Hart's Planet Drum and Phil Lesh & Friends over the years.

A self-described 'non-deadhead' in 1998, Karan joined RatDog, a band led by Grateful Dead alumnus Bob Weir. Karan was part of the RatDog lineup for most of the next 13 years. He also records or composes a wide variety of music for film, television, and music libraries.  His contributions to TV alone can currently be heard on over 15 networks and internationally in over 25 countries.

On June 30, 2009, Karan released his debut album Walk Through the Fire to critical acclaim. It features Delaney Bramlett, Billy Payne, Mike Finnigan, Pete Sears, John Molo, Hutch Hutchinson, The Persuasions, The Rowan Brothers, and many more.

His TV appearances include Austin City Limits, VH1 Classic's All Star Jams, Late Night with Conan O'Brien, Late Late Night with Craig Kilborn, Today Show and Regis & Kathy Lee. Karan has also been showcased in live performances and featured interviews on SiriusXM, in addition to commercial and specialty radio nationwide.

Karan also sometimes tours while leading his own band. He has performed with a band called Live Dead '69 as part of the Airplane Family & Friends tour in December 2016. He has also performed with Live/Dead '69 at shows they have performed at on their own. This band usually features former Grateful Dead keyboardist Tom Constanten and sometimes features Karan's RatDog band mates Robin Sylvester and Jay Lane.

Cancer battle
In July 2007, Karan announced that he was being treated for throat cancer. Steve Kimock sat in for Karan on the Ratdog summer tour. Karan returned to the lineup in March 2008 and remains in remission.

Touring credits
Paul Carrack – USA Tour (1988)
Dave Mason – World Tours (1991, 1992)
Sophie B. Hawkins – USA & Australian Tours (1996)
The Other Ones – USA Tour (1998, 2000)
Bob Weir & RatDog – USA Tours (1998–?)
Mickey Hart's Planet Drum – USA Summer Tour (1999, inc."Woodstock '99")
Delaney Bramlett – Mississippi Tour (2006)

Discography

Solo work
Jemimah Puddleduck (2000) – Jemimah Puddleduck
Walk Through the Fire (2009) – Mark Karan

Bands / live
The Strange Remain (1999) – The Other Ones
Evening Moods (2000) – Ratdog
Live at Roseland (2001) – Ratdog
On the Road: 07-02-06 Red Rocks (2006) – String Cheese Incident

Album sessions
Temptation (1981) – Holly Stanton
Beyond Passion (1990) – Sky
Chopped & Channeled (1991) – Dynatones
Makin' It Real (1993) – Jesse Colin Young
Exception to the Rule (1994) – Arnold McCuller
Crazy Boy (1995) – Jesse Colin Young
Moment of Truth (1996) – Jack James
Chicago Songs (1996) – Skip Haynes
Well (1996) – David Grow
Coast of Paradise (1996) – Suzy K
Open the Door (1998) – Janet Robin
Hindsight (1998) – John Purdell
Spin This! (1998) – Danny Wilde & The Rembrants
Still Searching for Soul (1999) – Corey Feldman's Truth Movement
Mister Blue (1999) – Mr. Blue
Pieces (1999) – P.J. Levy
Sounds from Home (2000) – Delaney Bramlett
Former Child Actor (2002) – Corey Feldman
Blue Sky (2003) – David Ralston
The Whole Enchilada (2003) – Teresa James
Emptiness and Ecstasy (2004) – Wynne Paris
Still Dancin''' (2006) – G 13Khemmenu: Land of the Moon (2006) – SkyCrossing the Line (2008) – Bill CutlerLive/Studio Closet Tapes (2008) – The Moonlighters (Bill Kirchen, Richard Casanova, Tony Johnson, Steve MacKay)A New Kind Of Blues (2008) – Delaney BramlettPersuasions of the Dead: The Grateful Dead Sessions (2011) – The Persuasions & FriendsFamily Business (2019) – Ronnie Penque

Compilation albumsBad Sci-Fi Soundtrack Series: Attack Of The Killer B Movies (1995) – various artists – performed with Scarecrow Adams)Further Most (2000) – "Ramble On Rose" and "Easy Answers", performed by the Other OnesKBCO Studio C, Volume 12 (2000) – "Odessa", performed by Bob Weir & RatdogKPRI Live Tracks 3 (2002) – "KC Moan", performed by Bob Weir & Mark KaranWeir Here - The Best of Bob Weir (2004) – Bob WeirKBCO Studio C, Volume 16 (2005) – "Ripple", performed by Bob Weir & RatdogKPFA Live From Berkeley (2005) – "Memphis Radio", performed by Jemimah PuddleduckJam on Guitars (2009) – various artists
KPFA Live From Berkeley, Vol 2 (2012) – "Leave a Light On", performed by A Mark Karan Experience

Singles sessions
"Run to Her" (1983) – Julie Stafford

Film and TV soundtracks
Chantilly Lace (1993) – Showtime (Patrick Seymour, composer) – guitar
Parallel Lives (1994) – Showtime (Patrick Seymour, composer) – guitar
Stonewall (1995) – (Michael Kamen, composer) – guitar
Orleans (1997) – CBS dramatic series (David Hamilton, composer) – guitar
Tricks (1997) – Showtime (Patrick Seymour, composer, also includes original song by MK & Patrick Seymour) – guitar
Waco: The Rules of Engagement (1996, Academy Award Nominated) – (David Hamilton, composer) – guitar
Scrubs (2001) – NBC (Jan Stevens/MK co-composers) – guitar
Fall of Night (2005) – MK original song "No Escape" –  closing credit roll
Asylum (2009) (David Hamilton, composer) – guitar
Guitar Man (1015) – guitar on two songs on the soundtrack: "All Along the Watchtower" and "Love in Vain"

References

External links
 Mark Karan's official website
 Ratdog's official site

American rock guitarists
American male guitarists
1955 births
Living people
Guitarists from San Francisco
Singers from San Francisco
RatDog members
20th-century American guitarists
20th-century American male musicians